Sebastián Ignacio Caballero (born 6 January 1992) is an Argentine professional footballer who plays as a right midfielder for Rodos.

Career
Caballero made his entrance into senior club football with Unión Santa Fe in June 2009, making his professional debut at aged seventeen during an away victory against Aldosivi in Primera B Nacional. He didn't feature for the club again until 2013–14, which followed a loan spell with fellow second tier team Deportivo Merlo; with whom he made thirteen appearances for. In January 2016, after nine years and thirty-four matches - including in the 2015 Argentine Primera División after promotion - with Unión Santa Fe, Caballero left to sign for Atlético Paraná. One goal in twenty-eight fixtures followed over two campaigns.

On 31 July 2017, Gamma Ethniki side Volos completed the signing of Caballero. In his first season, the club were promoted to the Greek Football League as he played twenty-four times. He was released at the conclusion of 2018–19, after one goal in twenty-five league games as Volos won a second consecutive promotion. In August 2019, Caballero joined newly promoted Football League team Niki Volos. However, on 1 October 2019, he left for Italian Serie D club Audace Cerignola. July 2020 saw Caballero head back to Greece with Rodos.

Career statistics
.

Honours
Volos
Gamma Ethniki: 2017–18
Football League: 2018–19

References

External links

1992 births
Living people
Footballers from Santa Fe, Argentina
Argentine footballers
Association football midfielders
Argentine expatriate footballers
Expatriate footballers in Greece
Expatriate footballers in Italy
Argentine expatriate sportspeople in Greece
Argentine expatriate sportspeople in Italy
Primera Nacional players
Argentine Primera División players
Gamma Ethniki players
Football League (Greece) players
Unión de Santa Fe footballers
Deportivo Merlo footballers
Club Atlético Paraná players
Volos N.F.C. players
Niki Volos F.C. players
S.S.D. Audace Cerignola players
Rodos F.C. players